Michael Naughten (born May 28, 1835 in County Meath) was an Irish clergyman and bishop for the Roman Catholic Diocese of Roseau in Dominica. 
He went to Dominica along with Fr John Molly and Fr. Patrick Smith, all from the College of All Hallows in Dublin, Ireland, where they were trained for the foreign missions.
He was appointed bishop in 1879, and consecrated bishop in Mullingar by Bishop Nulty, in 1880 the 4th Bishop of Roseau, successor to Bishop René-Marie-Charles Poirier. 
Bishop Naughton invited  The Nuns of the Faithful Virgin, from Kennsington, England, to operate schools in the Diocese.

He died on July 4 1900.

References 

1835 births
1900 deaths
People from County Meath
Roman Catholic bishops of Roseau
19th-century Irish bishops
Irish expatriate Catholic bishops
Alumni of All Hallows College, Dublin